Jörgen Lindman (born 7 August 1951) is a Swedish former professional footballer who played as a defender. He made 70 Allsvenskan appearances for Djurgården and scored one goal.

Lindman managed Djurgården's women's team in the 1983 and 1988 seasons.

Jörgen is the brother of Djurgården footballer Sven Lindman.

References

Living people
1951 births
Swedish footballers
Association football defenders
Allsvenskan players
Djurgårdens IF Fotboll players
Swedish football managers
Djurgårdens IF Fotboll (women) managers
Vasalunds IF players